The Jackson State University Botanical Garden is a botanical garden located on the campus of Jackson State University at 1400 Lynch Street, Jackson, Mississippi.

See also 
 List of botanical gardens in the United States

Jackson State University
Botanical gardens in Mississippi
Protected areas of Hinds County, Mississippi
Tourist attractions in Jackson, Mississippi